Americium(III) chloride or americium trichloride is the chemical compound composed of americium and chlorine with the formula AmCl3. This salt forms pink hexagonal crystals. 
In the solid state each americium atom has nine chlorine atoms as near neighbours, at approximately the same distance, in a tricapped trigonal prismatic configuration.

The hexahydrate has a monocline crystal structure with: a = 970.2 pm, b = 656.7 pm and c = 800.9 pm; β = 93° 37'; space group: P2/n.

Reactions 
An americium(III) chloride electrorefining method has been investigated to separate mixtures of actinides, since the standard Gibbs free energy of formation of americium(III) chloride is much different than the rest of the actinide chlorides.
This can be used to remove americium from plutonium by melting the crude mixture together with salts such as sodium chloride.

References 

Americium compounds
Chlorides
Actinide halides